Stage 5 is an unofficial stage at the Walnut Valley Festival in Winfield, Kansas.

Stage 5 may also refer to:

Arts and entertainment 
 Stage 5 Rep, a theater company in Columbus
 "Stage 5" (The Sopranos), 79th episode of The Sopranos
 Stage 5, an album in the Everywhere at the End of Time series by the Caretaker

Sports 
 2020–21 Biathlon World Cup – Stage 5
 Stage 5 of the 2021 OpTic Chicago season

Other uses 
 Cambrian Stage 5 or Wuliuan, the 5th stage of the Cambrian Period
 Marine Isotope Stage 5
 Stage 5 Chronic Kidney Disease

See also 
 Stage 54
 5 stages (disambiguation)